José Manuel Ribalta (born March 31, 1963) is a Cuban former professional boxer who competed in the heavyweight division from 1982 to 1999. He is best known for his fight against Mike Tyson in 1986.

Early years 
Ribalta's family fled Cuba by way of the Freedom Flights in 1967 and settled in Adams Morgan area of Washington, D.C. Then four years later the family moved to Miami, the city with the largest Cuban diaspora outside of Cuba. Both of his older brothers (all three were named José) were boxers. The oldest brother (the first to move to the United States) competed in the welterweight division and had three professional fights in the US. The middle of the three brothers was a boxer in Cuba, where he faced Teófilo Stevenson three times in the amateur ring and lost to him three times, and also fought Aziz Salihu. The younger José started boxing in the United States in the mid-1970s. He did not go through the Cuban school, but became the best known of the Ribalta brothers.

Professional career 
Ribalta made his professional debut in 1982. He had 10 straight wins. In 1983, he lost to Ricardo Richardson by TKO in the 7th round. Then Ribalta won another 7 fights. Advancing on the list of professional boxing rankings, Ribalta made his living as a sparring partner for WBC champion Trevor Berbick and title contender Gerry Cooney.

In July 1985, his first nationally televised bout took place against James "Bonecrusher" Smith. Ribalta lost by a split decision. The audience was loudly outraged by the decision of the judges, and Ribalta considered that he was "robbed". In September 1985, Ribalta faced Marvis Frazier. After a close battle, Frazier won the fight by a majority decision. In May 1986, he was knocked down by David Jaco, but managed to turn the tide of the fight and won by knockout in the fifth round.

On 17 August 1986, Ribalta faced Mike Tyson in a fight broadcast on HBO prepaid. At the time of the fight, Ribalta was ranked #10 in the WBC ranking. In the fight, Ribalta was knocked down three times and eventually lost by TKO in the 10th round, when the fight was stopped after Tyson's next series of strikes landed on Ribalta, who was pressed against the ropes. Tyson hit Ribalta 220 times. In 2014, Tyson rated Ribalta as the strongest opponent he faced, and the one with the best chin.

In 1987, Ribalta defeated Leon Spinks, knocking him down three times in the first round. Then he defeated Mark Young and Steve Zouski.

In 1990, Ribalta faced Tim Witherspoon and lost by majority decision.

In 1991, he lost to Bruce Seldon and Pierre Coetzer.

In April 1992, he was knocked out by Frank Bruno in the 2nd round. In October 1992, Ribalta faced Michael Dokes and lost by unanimous decision.

In September 1993, he lost against Larry Holmes by unanimous decision. In December 1993, Ribalta lost a unanimous decision in a 3-round bout against Tony Tubbs in a national heavyweight tournament in the Bay Saint Louis, Mississippi.

In 1994, Ribalta lost against Joe Hipp by knockout in the 2nd round. Then he won five fights, which were followed by losses against Axel Schulz, Larry Donald, Vitali Klitschko, and Chris Byrd.

In 1999, Ribalta lost by knockout in the 1st round against Donovan Ruddock, after which he retired from professional boxing.

He was inducted into the Florida Boxing Hall of Fame in 2014.

Ribalta is the author of “Courage In The Ring“, his autobiography of his life as a professional athlete.

Professional boxing record

References

External links
 

1963 births
Living people
Cuban male boxers
Heavyweight boxers
Cuban emigrants to the United States
Sportspeople from Miami
20th-century Cuban people